The Virginia class (also known as the CGN-38 class) were four nuclear-powered, guided-missile cruisers that served in the United States Navy until the mid-to-late 1990s. The double-ended cruisers (with missile armament carried both fore and aft) were commissioned between 1976 and 1980. They were the final class of nuclear-powered cruisers completed and the last ships ordered as Destroyer Leaders under the pre-1975 classification system.

The ships had relatively short service lives. As nuclear-powered ships, they were expensive to operate. The class was coming up for their mid-life reactor refuelings when the 1994 Defense Authorization Bill was being formulated, which would effect cuts of 38% to the Navy's budget compared to the 1993 bill. The $300-million-plus cost of each refueling and other upgrades made the class easy targets for decommissioning. Each ship was therefore retired, starting with Texas in July 1993 and ending with Arkansas in 1998; all went through the nuclear vessel decommissioning and recycling program.

Class description

The ships were derived from the earlier California-class nuclear cruiser (CGN-36 class). Three of the four Virginia-class ships were authorized as guided-missile frigates (in the pre-1975 definition); they were redesignated as cruisers before commissioning or launching. The last ship, Arkansas, was authorized, laid down, launched, and commissioned as a guided-missile cruiser. A fifth member of the class, CGN-42, was canceled before being named or laid down.

They also had excellent flagship facilities. Their primary mission was as air-defense ships, while they also had capabilities as anti-submarine (ASW) ships, surface-to-surface warfare (SSW) ships, and in gun and missile bombardment of shore targets. 

The Virginia class, as designed, carried one LAMPS helicopter aft of the superstructure with a flight deck. In a unique arrangement in the U.S. Navy, the hangars were below deck, with an electro-mechanical elevator covered by a telescopic hatch. This improved over the preceding California class, which only had a landing pad aft and basic refueling equipment.

It was found that, while it was possible to mass-produce nuclear-powered warships, the ships were less cost-efficient than conventionally powered warships. Also, the new gas turbine-powered ships then entering the fleet—the s—required much less manpower. While eleven ships of the Virginia class were planned, only four were produced, and the remainder were canceled. Following the completion of the final member of the class, Arkansas, the U.S. Navy continued conventional destroyer/cruiser production, and it redesignated the DDG-47 class of guided-missile destroyers as the CG-47 s.

Refit

In the 1980s, the class received a New Threat Upgrade electronics overhaul to better suit them to modern threats. Their rapid-fire Mk 26 launchers could fire the powerful Standard SM-2MR medium-range surface-to-air missile—earlier decommissioned cruisers used the slower-firing Mk 10 launchers, which required manual fitting of the missiles' fins prior to launch.
Nevertheless, the CGN-38-class cruisers, with their missile magazines and Mk 26 missile launchers, were incapable of carrying the SM-2ER long-range surface-to-air missile; they were restricted to the SM-2MR medium-range surface-to-air missile. This was a significant limitation in their capabilities. 

Each member of the class also received Tomahawk cruise missile armored box launchers. The Tomahawk missiles were installed, even though this meant the removal of the LAMPS helicopter as it was found that the elevator and below-deck hangar proved problematic during aviation operations.

Early decommissioning

All four vessels were decommissioned as part of the early 1990s "peace dividend" after the Cold War ended, considered by naval standards an early retirement given their designed service life of 38 years. Despite being of a modern design with a recent refit, what doomed the Virginia nuclear-powered cruisers was a lack of resources, as the Navy and other branches of the U.S. military were downsizing after the Cold War. The ships of the class were coming due for their first nuclear refuelings, mid-life overhauls, and NTU refittings, which were all budgeted projects, together costing about half the price of a new ship. Further, they required relatively large crews, straining the operating budget. Given a lower requirement for cruisers, it was decided to retire Virginias and other nuclear-powered ships as a money-saving measure, a decision made while Texas was in the middle of her refueling overhaul. The early Ticonderoga-class cruisers, which lacked the Vertical Launch System, had equally short careers, serving between 18 and 21 years.

Ships in class

See also
 List of cruisers of the United States Navy
 List of United States Navy destroyer leaders
 Nuclear powered cruisers of the United States Navy

References

 This entry includes information from the sci.military.naval newsgroup FAQ

External links

 Globalsecurity.org Virginia class
 Plans for an Aegis modified Virginia class

Cruiser classes